Tayyab Abbas (born 6 September 1994) is a Pakistani cricketer. He made his List A debut on 14 January 2017 for Rawalpindi in the 2016–17 Regional One Day Cup.

References

External links
 

1994 births
Living people
Pakistani cricketers
Rawalpindi cricketers
People from Attock District